Debarq (Amharic: ድባርቅ) is one of the woredas in the Amhara Region of Ethiopia. It is named after its largest town, Debarq. Part of the Semien Gondar Zone, Debarq is bordered on the south by Dabat,
on the west by Tegeda, on the northwest by the Tigray Region, on the north by Addi Arkay, and on the east by Jan Amora.

This woreda is crossed by the Lamalmo Mountains, which form the western end of the Semien. Rivers include the Zarima.

Due to its inaccessibility and the lack of the most basic infrastructure, in 1999 the Regional government classified Debarq as one of its 47 drought-prone and food-insecure woredas. To alleviate this situation, the Amhara Credit and Saving Institution SC, a micro-finance institution, opened an office in Debarq in the late 1990s. On 27 May 2009, the Ethiopian Roads Authority announced work to repair and upgrade the road between Debarq and Gondar had begun. The budget for the work is approximately 690 million Birr.

Demographics
Based on the 2007 national census conducted by the Central Statistical Agency of Ethiopia (CSA), this woreda has a total population of 159,193, an increase of 31.83% over the 1994 census, of whom 80,274 are men and 78,919 women; 20,839 or 13.09% are urban inhabitants. A total of 33,822 households were counted in this woreda, resulting in an average of 4.71 persons to a household, and 32,573 housing units. The majority of the inhabitants practiced Ethiopian Orthodox Christianity, with 94.8% reporting that as their religion, while 5.2% of the population said they were Muslim.

The 1994 national census reported a total population for this woreda of 120,754 in 21,646 households, of whom 60,372 were men and 60,382 women; 14,474 or 11.99% of its population were urban dwellers at the time. The largest ethnic group reported in Debarq was the Amhara (99.42%); all other ethnic groups made up 0.58% of the population. Amharic was spoken as a first language by 99.46%; the remaining 0.54% spoke all other primary languages reported. 93.78% practiced Ethiopian Orthodox Christianity, and 6.16% of the population said they were Muslim.

Notes

Districts of Amhara Region